The Hauterivian is, in the geologic timescale, an age in the Early Cretaceous Epoch or a stage in the Lower Cretaceous Series. It spans the time between 132.9 ± 2 Ma and 129.4 ± 1.5 Ma (million years ago). The Hauterivian is preceded by the Valanginian and succeeded by the Barremian.

Stratigraphic definitions
The Hauterivian was introduced in scientific literature by Swiss geologist Eugène Renevier in 1873. It is named after the Swiss town of Hauterive at the shore of Lake Neuchâtel.

The base of the Hauterivian is defined as the place in the stratigraphic column where the ammonite genus Acanthodiscus first appears. A reference profile for the base (a GSSP) was officially ratified by the International Union of Geological Sciences in December of 2019, and is placed in La Charce, France. The top of the Hauterivian (the base of the Barremian) is at the first appearance of ammonite species Spitidiscus hugii.

In the ammonite biostratigraphy of the Tethys domain, the Hauterivian contains seven ammonite biozones:
 zone of Pseudothurmannia ohmi
 zone of Balearites balearis
 zone of Plesiospitidiscus ligatus
 zone of Subsaynella sayni
 zone of Lyticoceras nodosoplicatus
 zone of Crioceratites loryi
 zone of Acanthodiscus radiatus

References

Notes

Literature
; (2004): A Geologic Time Scale 2004, Cambridge University Press.

External links
GeoWhen Database - Hauterivian
Mid-Cretaceous timescale, at the website of the subcommission for stratigraphic information of the ICS
Stratigraphic chart of the Lower Cretaceous, at the website of Norges Network of offshore records of geology and stratigraphy
Hauterivian Microfossils: 25+ images of Foraminifera

 
03
Geological ages
Cretaceous geochronology